Steve Torpey may refer to:
 Steve Torpey (footballer, born 1970), former Swansea City and Scunthorpe United player, currently coaching at York City
 Steve Torpey (footballer, born 1981), former Liverpool, Port Vale and F.C. United of Manchester player